LLP Group is an international software services company founded in the Czech Republic specializing in business software consulting, software development, and ERP implementations. It provides consulting and software services to both local and international companies throughout Europe, North America and Mexico. LLP Group operates in over 70 countries worldwide.

History 

LLP was founded in 1992 in Prague. Other branches followed in Central Europe: Slovakia (est. 1995), Hungary (est. 1996), Romania (est. 1997), Bulgaria (est. 2000). LLP expanded through implementing Infor SunSystems for international companies (such as Kraft Foods, Unilever, Johnson & Johnson, Shell, BP, PwC, KPMG, the Parliament of the United Kingdom, etc.) in multiple locations throughout the Central European region. It later expanded westward in Luxembourg (est. 2008), Mexico (est. 2009) and the United States (est. 2012).

LLP Group was also associated with Central European Business Weekly, a weekly Business magazine.

In 2010 the group was divided into three divisions: LLP Group, LLP Dynamics and systems@work. The LLP Dynamics division was sold at the end of 2013 to Xapt Hungary.

In August 2014, LLP became Microsoft Gold Partner. LLP is the Microsoft Awards winner for CRM projects in 2018, 2016 and 2015 in the Czech Republic. 

In January 2016, LLP's customer relationship management division turned into a separate company, LLP CRM.

In February 2020, LLP Group established its latest division, LLP Technology, to offer technical and development services using Infor OS, a cloud operating platform. LLP Technology also develops custom software and integrations to other ERP systems in addition to providing consulting on hardware and software. In 2021, LLP Group became a Hexagon Partner reselling and implementing HxGN EAM (formerly Infor EAM).

Products 

LLP's core business is the implementation of SunSystems from Systems Union, now Infor.
In the late 1990s and in the 2000s, as markets developed, LLP expanded its portfolio of products to include other ERP products, such as Microsoft Dynamics, NAV and AX, customer relationship management products such as Pivotal and Dynamics 365, asset management solution HxGN EAM and business intelligence products such as Infor d/EPM. The company also set out to develop a professional services automation product, time@work, from which a web-based expense management tool, expense@work, and forms management tool, forms@work, were later derived. Systems@work was eventually split off into a separate company, systems@work.

Sponsorship 

LLP Group supports BUMI, a humanitarian and development charity working in the Katanga province of the Democratic Republic of Congo. BUMI provides shelter and education for vulnerable children, including orphans and street children.

For a number of years LLP Group provided support for the Theatre School for Children at Risk, held annually in August at the Katya Vancheva Orphanage, Shiroka Laka, in the Rhodope Mountains of Bulgaria.

LLP Group was the main sponsor of the Talent roku (Talent of the year) musical competition whose laureates are Michal Sťahel (1999), Jana Vonášková-Nováková (2000), Jordana Palovičová (2001) and Václav Vonášek (2002). Talent roku was based on the BBC Young Musician of the Year and the prize was one year at the Royal College of Music, in London.

References 

1992 establishments in Czechoslovakia
Software companies of the Czech Republic
Companies based in Prague